Akourdaleia may refer to:

Kato Akourdaleia, Paphos District, Cyprus
Pano Akourdaleia, Paphos District, Cyprus